The Hypo helmet, or British Smoke Hood (its official name), was an early British World War I gas mask, designed by Cluny MacPherson.

Earlier designs
The German army used poison gas for the first time against Entente troops at the Second Battle of Ypres, Belgium on 22 April 1915. As an immediate response, the British began issuing cotton wool wrapped in muslin to its troops by 3 May. This was followed by the Black Veil Respirator, invented by John Scott Haldane, which began to be issued to troops on 20 May 1915. The Black Veil was a cotton pad soaked in an absorbent solution which was secured over the mouth using black cotton veiling. The veiling could be drawn up to cover the eyes, providing some protection against lachrymatory agents, however the mask itself still only provided little protection against chlorine gas. It was also of fragile construction, required training to use effectively and largely immobilized men during a gas attack as they were concerned about their mask coming loose.

Development and design
Seeking to improve on the Black Veil Respirator, Dr Cluny Macpherson created a mask made of chemical absorbing fabric and which fitted over the entire head. MacPherson had seen a German soldier putting a bag over his head after a gas attack and sought to replicate the design.  Macpherson presented his idea to the War Office Anti-Gas Department on 10 May 1915, with prototypes being developed soon after. The design was adopted by the British Army and introduced as the "British Smoke Hood" in June 1915 and manufactured until September 1915. 2.5 million mask were manufactured before being superseded by subsequent designs.

The design consisted of a  canvas hood treated with chlorine-absorbing chemicals, and fitted with a single rectangular mica eyepiece. It was simply a khaki-coloured flannel bag soaked in a solution of glycerin and sodium thiosulphate. The soldier placed it over his head and tucked the bottom into his tunic. No inlet or exhaust valve was provided, and the wearer's lungs forced the air through the material making up the bag.

Later versions
This primitive type of mask went through several stages of development before being superseded in 1916 by the canister gas mask. More elaborate sorbent compounds were added later to further iterations of the helmet (P Helmet and PH helmet), to defeat other respiratory poison gases used such as phosgene, diphosgene and chloropicrin.

References

Bibliography

 
 
 
 

World War I military equipment of the United Kingdom
Gas masks of the United Kingdom